Past Reason Hated is the fifth novel by Canadian detective fiction writer Peter Robinson in the Inspector Banks series of novels. It was published in 1991, and won the 1992 Arthur Ellis Award for 'Best Novel'.

Plot
The body of Caroline Hartley is found one evening before Christmas by her lover, Veronica Shildon. It is a cosy scene–log fire, sheepskin rug, Vivaldi on the stereo, Christmas lights and tree–but Caroline is naked and covered in blood. Detective Constable Susan Gay is the first detective at the scene. She has recently been promoted to C.I.D. and the case soon takes on overwhelming professional and personal importance for her. DC Gay and Chief Inspector Alan Banks soon find plenty of suspects as they begin to delve into Caroline’s past and the women’s present life: Veronica’s ex-husband, who is a well-known composer; a feminist poet; the cast and crew of a play Caroline was rehearsing; and Caroline’s eccentric, reclusive brother, Gary Hartley. Inspector Banks’s fifth case is an ironic, suspenseful tale of family secrets, hidden passions and desperate violence.

References

External links
Dedicated page on author's website

1990 Canadian novels
Novels by Peter Robinson (novelist)
Novels set in Yorkshire
Viking Press books